Lupinus elmeri is an uncommon species of lupine known by the common names Elmer's lupine and South Fork Mountain lupine. It is endemic to California, where it is known only from a few scattered occurrences in the northernmost slopes of the North Coast Ranges. This is an erect perennial herb with a thick reddish stem and green, hairy herbage. It reaches a maximum height near . The inflorescence bears pale yellow flowers each roughly a centimeter long which are not arranged in whorls as they are in many other lupines.

References

External links
Jepson Manual Treatment
Photo gallery

elmeri
Endemic flora of California